Ragnar is a masculine Germanic given name, composed of the Old Norse elements ragin- "counsel" and hari- "army".

Origin and variations 
The Proto-Germanic forms of the compounds are "ragina" (counsel) and "harjaz" or "hariz" (army). The Old High German form is Raginheri, Reginheri, which gave rise to the modern German form Rainer, the French variant Rainier, the Italian variant Ranieri and the Latvian variant Renārs. The Old English form is "Rægenhere" (attested for example in the name of the son of king Rædwald of East-Anglia). The name also existed among the Franks as "Ragnahar" (recorded as Ragnachar in the book "History of the Franks" by Gregory of Tours).

History of usage 
The name is on record since the 9th century, both in Scandinavia and in the Frankish empire; the form Raginari is recorded in a Vandalic (5th or 6th century) graffito in Carthage.

The name was variously latinized as Raganarius, Reginarius, Ragenarius, Raginerus, Ragnerus, Reginherus. 
The Scandinavian patronymic form is Ragnarsson.

In the modern period, the name was rarely given before the 1880s.
It enjoyed a revival in the late 19th and early 20th century, in connection with national romanticism in Scandinavia.  
The name is now current as Ragnar in Iceland, Norway, Sweden and The Faroe Islands and as Ragner in Denmark. A hypocoristic form used in Sweden is Ragge.
The name's popularity in Norway peaked during the 1920s and 1930s, during which time it was given to more than 0.7% of newly born boys, but it  has declined ever since the late 1930s, falling below the fraction of 0.1% of given names in the 1970s. The Norwegian statistics office reports 4,652 Norwegian men with the given name in 2015.

In Iceland, the name remains popular, recorded at rank 21 (given to 0.76% of newly born boys) as of 2014. The Icelandic statistics office recorded
1,286 Icelandic men (0.2%) with the given name as of November 2005.

Given name

Medieval

 Ragnar Lodbrok, 9th century Viking
 Ragenar, a 9th-century Frankish bishop
 Reginar, Duke of Lorraine (circa 850–915)
 Reginar II, Count of Hainaut (890–932) 
 Reginar III, Count of Hainaut (circa 920–973)
 Reginar IV, Count of Mons (circa 950–1013)
 Reginar V, Count of Mons (circa 995–1039)
 Rainier, Margrave of Tuscany (r. 1014–1027) 
 Saint Rainier (c. 1117–c. 1160), Pisan saint, also be spelled Raynerius, Rainerius, Rainieri, Ranieri, Raniero, or Regnier.
 Renier of Montferrat (1162–1183),  son-in-law of Byzantine Emperor Manuel I Komnenos. In Italian, Ranieri del Monferrato.
 Rainier, Marquess of Montferrat (c. 1084-1135), Ranieri I del Monferrato or Marchesato del Monferrato, ruler of the state of Montferrat in north-west Italy from about 1100 to his death.
 Rainier I of Monaco, Lord of Cagnes (1267–1314)
 Rainier II, Lord of Monaco (14th century)

Modern
See 
Ragnar Edenman (1914–1998), Swedish politician 
Ragnar Ekberg (1886–1966), Swedish athlete
Ragnar Fjørtoft (1913–1998), Norwegian meteorologist
Ragnar Fogelmark (1888–1914), Swedish wrestler
Ragnar Frisch (1895–1973), Norwegian economist 
Ragnar Granit  (1900–1991), Finnish-Swedish Nobel laureate
Ragnar Gripe (1883–1942), Swedish sailor
Ragnar Hult (1857–1899), Finnish botanist and plant geographer
 Einar Ragnar Jónsson, known as Ragnar í Smára (1904–1984), Icelandic art patron, publisher and art collector
Ragnar Josephson (1891–1966), Swedish art historian and writer
Ragnar Kjartansson (performance artist) (born 1976), Icelandic performance artist
Ragnar Klavan (born 1985), Estonian footballer
Ragnar Musgrave Colvin (1882–1954), British navy officer
Ragnar Olson (1880–1955) was a Swedish horse rider 
Ragnar Östberg (1866–1945), Swedish architect
Ragnar Rump (born 1991), Estonian football and futsal player
Ragnar Sigurðsson (born 1986), Icelandic professional footballer
Ragnar Sigvald Skancke (1890–1948), Norwegian politician
Ragnar Sohlman (1870–1948), Swedish chemical engineer and creator of the Nobel Foundation

Surname 
Sven Erik Ragnar
Per Ragnar

Pseudonym
Ragnar Redbeard, the pseudonymous author of Might Is Right (1890)

Fictional characters
Ragnar Lothbrok, main character in the television series Vikings, portrayed by Travis Fimmel and based on Ragnar Lodbrok
Ragnar Danneskjöld, character in Ayn Rand's novel Atlas Shrugged (1957)
Ragnar McRyan, character from the role-playing game Dragon Quest IV: Chapters of the Chosen (1990)
Ragnar Sturlusson, character in the film The Golden Compass (1995)
Ragnar Blackmane, "Thunderfist", character in the Space Wolf series by William King (1999)
Ragnar, the main character in the video game Rune (2000)
Ragnar Ravnson and his son, Ragnar Ragnarson, characters from The Saxon Stories historical novel series by Bernard Cornwell (2004)
Ragnar Volarus, character in the Red Rising trilogy (2015)

References

See also
Rainer (given name)
Rainer (surname)
Reginar
Reina (given name)
Ragnar (disambiguation)
Regnier (disambiguation)
Reynier (disambiguation)
Reinier
Rainier (disambiguation)
Ranieri
Renārs
Ragnar Relay Series, series of distance relay races
Ragnar, the former mascot of the Minnesota Vikings American football team

Scandinavian masculine given names
Danish masculine given names
Estonian masculine given names
Faroese masculine given names
Icelandic masculine given names
Norwegian masculine given names
Swedish masculine given names